Benavente may refer to:

Places
 Benavente, Portugal, a municipality in Portugal
 Benavente, Zamora, a municipality in Zamora province, Spain
 Benavente (Hormigueros), a district of Hormigueros, Puerto Rico
 Benavente, Guam, a municipality in Guam

Other uses
 Benavente (surname), a Spanish surname